The Rawalpindi Women University (RWU) is a public university funded by the Government of Punjab, Pakistan in Rawalpindi, Punjab, Pakistan. The university has been running 15 BS Honors,16 Masters and 1 M.Phil. program successfully.

The university was founded in 2019 as government of Punjab upgraded Government Post Graduate Girls College Satellite Town, Rawalpindi.

History 
Originally, Rawalpindi Women University was first established as a women's degree college in 1950 in the heart of the Rawalpindi city. College spread on 160 kanals, its aim was to impart quality education to women. With the time being, in 1983 college commitment to excellence, the government deemed it fit to raise its status to a postgraduate college. Later in 2010, 26 best colleges were selected within the province Punjab, with an aim to launch BS Honors Programs and RWU was on the top of the list. This college was selected as the Sub-Campus of the University of Gujrat in 2014. Since then, its functioning and capacity has been equal to that of any university in the province Punjab. Finally, in 2019 that as a recognition of the quality service provided in the field of women education in Rawalpindi city, this postgraduate college was inaugurated as a University on 12th April, 2019.

Faculties and Departments 
The Rawalpindi Women University has divided into two academic sections, Faculty of Sciences and Faculty of Humanities Social Sciences.

Faculty of Sciences 

 Department of Chemistry
 Department of Botany
 Department of Zoology
 Department of Physics
 Department of Mathematics
 Department of Statistics
 Department of Computer Science
 Department of Information Technology

Faculty of Humanities Social Sciences 

 Department of Business Administration
 Department of Psychology 
 Department of Political Science 
 Department of English
 Department of Urdu
 Department of Mass Communication
 Department of Fine Arts

Research, Innovation and Commercialization 
In Rawalpindi Women University, Office of Research, Innovation and Commercialization (ORIC) is established according to Higher Education Commission guidelines. Office of Research, Innovation and Commercialization is built to comply with Higher Education Commission's mission of transforming Universities of Pakistan to drive high impact innovation, applied research and entrepreneurship.

References

2019 establishments in Pakistan
Public universities and colleges in Punjab, Pakistan
Women's universities and colleges in Pakistan
Universities and colleges in Rawalpindi District